Salavre is a commune in the Ain department in eastern France.

Geography
The village lies on a small river, known as le Bief Laval, a tributary of the Solnan.

The Solnan forms part of the commune's western border.

Population

See also
Communes of the Ain department

References

Communes of Ain
Ain communes articles needing translation from French Wikipedia